Jamnagar Lok Sabha constituency is one of the 26 Lok Sabha (parliamentary)  constituencies in Gujarat state in western India.

Assembly segments
Presently, Jamnagar Lok Sabha constituency comprises seven Vidhan Sabha (legislative assembly) segments. These are:

Members of Parliament

General Elections

2019

2014

2009

2004

See also
 Jamnagar district
 List of Constituencies of the Lok Sabha

Notes

Lok Sabha constituencies in Gujarat
Jamnagar district